The Fourteenth Amendment of the Constitution of South Africa (formally the Constitution Fourteenth Amendment Act of 2008) repealed some of the provisions inserted into the Constitution by the Ninth and Tenth Amendments which allowed for floor-crossing, that is, allowed members of legislative bodies to move from one political party to another without losing their seats. The remaining floor-crossing provisions were repealed by the Fifteenth Amendment, which was enacted at the same time.

The Fourteenth Amendment contained the repeal provisions which affected the provincial legislatures and the National Council of Provinces (NCOP), and therefore had to be approved by six of nine provinces in the NCOP as well as by two-thirds of the National Assembly, while the Fifteenth Amendment contained the remaining provisions which only had to be approved by the Assembly. The bills for both amendments were passed by the National Assembly on 20 August 2008, with the Fourteenth Amendment receiving 310 votes in favour and none opposed. The bill for the Fourteenth Amendment was passed by the NCOP on 19 November 2008 with all nine provinces voting in favour. Both amendments were signed by President Kgalema Motlanthe on 6 January 2009, and came into force on 17 April 2009, days before the 2009 general election.

References

External links

 Official text (PDF)

Amendments of the Constitution of South Africa
2008 in South African law
2008 legislation